Tachykinin receptor 3, also known as TACR3, is a protein which in humans is encoded by the TACR3 gene.

Function 

This gene belongs to a family of genes that function as receptors for tachykinins.  Receptor affinities are specified by variations in the 5'-end of the sequence.  The receptors belonging to this family are characterized by interactions with G proteins and 7 hydrophobic transmembrane regions.  This gene encodes the receptor for the tachykinin neurokinin 3, also referred to as neurokinin B.

Selective ligands 
A number of selective ligands are available for NK3. NK3 receptor antagonists are being investigated as treatments for various indications.

Agonists 
 Neurokinin B – endogenous peptide ligand, also interacts with other neurokinin receptors but has highest affinity for NK3
 Senktide – 7-amino acid polypeptide, NK3 selective, CAS# 106128-89-6

Antagonists 
 Elinzanetant (BAY-3427080 GSK-1144814, NT-814)
 Fezolinetant (ESN-364)
 Osanetant (SR-142,801)
 Pavinetant (MLE-4901, AZD-4901, AZD-2624)
 Talnetant (SB-223,412)
 SB-222,200 – potent and selective antagonist, Ki = 4.4 nM, 3-Methyl-2-phenyl-N-[(1S)-1-phenylpropyl]-4-quinolinecarboxamide, CAS# 174635-69-9
 SB-218,795 – more selective than SB-222,200, Ki = 13 nM, (R)-[(2-Phenyl-4-quinolinylcarbonyl)amino]-methyl ester benzeneacetic acid, CAS# 174635-53-1

See also 
 Tachykinin receptor

References

Further reading

External links 
 

G protein-coupled receptors